Cephas "Milo Calhoun" Colquhoun (21 September 1940 – 15 March 1995) was a Jamaican professional boxer of the 1960s and 1970s who won the British Commonwealth middleweight title.

References

External links
 

1940 births
1995 deaths
Middleweight boxers
Light-heavyweight boxers
Cruiserweight boxers
Jamaican male boxers
Sportspeople from Kingston, Jamaica
Boxers at the 1962 British Empire and Commonwealth Games
Commonwealth Games gold medallists for Jamaica
Commonwealth Games medallists in boxing
Competitors at the 1962 Central American and Caribbean Games
Central American and Caribbean Games gold medalists for Jamaica
Central American and Caribbean Games medalists in boxing
20th-century Jamaican people
Medallists at the 1962 British Empire and Commonwealth Games